Selinus (Latin for Selinunte) was a city of ancient Sicily.

Selinus may also refer to:

Geography
Selinus (Cilicia), a city of ancient Cilicia, in Asia Minor
Selinus (Laconia), a village of ancient Laconia, Greece
Selinus (Sporades), a town of the ancient Sporades islands in Greece
Selinus, ancient name of the Selinountas river, Greece

Biology
Celery, an edible plant
Celeriac, an edible plant

Other uses
Selinus (mythology), a figure in Greek mythology
Battle of Selinus, fought near the city

See also
Selinous (disambiguation)